"Really Doe" is a song recorded by American rapper and actor Ice Cube on his fourth studio album, Lethal Injection (1993) which serves as the lead single from the album. "My Skin Is My Sin", a song which later appeared on his album Bootlegs & B-Sides (1994), is the B-side for this song. "Really Doe" samples "You Gotta Believe It" by The Pointer Sisters and "Lick the Balls" by Slick Rick. This song is produced by Derrick McDowell and Lay Law. "Really Doe" also has a music video released. B-Real of Cypress Hill also makes an appearance in the music video as the judge.

Charts

References

1993 songs
Ice Cube songs
Music videos directed by F. Gary Gray
Songs written by Ice Cube
Gangsta rap songs